Jessica Harris is a fictional character from the British Channel 4 soap opera Hollyoaks, played by Jennifer Biddall. She debuted on-screen during episodes airing in October 2005. Biddal decided to leave the serial in December 2007, Jessica last appeared on 31 December 2007, And Biddall has since admitted she doesn't want to return to the serial. Jessica's notable storylines include affairs, being unlucky in love, gambling and a carbon monoxide plot.

Casting
In 2005, Jessica was created by executive producer David Hanson and actress Jennifer Biddall was cast into the role.
In 2007, it was revealed that Biddall had quit the serial in order to pursue other projects. Executive producer Bryan Kirkwood stated: "Jenny Biddall is in the pipeline to be leaving at the end of the year. She steps rather too readily into Zoe's shoes when Darren starts on his winning streak and they form a Bonnie and Clyde partnership which is very funny but she leaves in a dramatic twist in the New Year episode." Biddall later said she wouldn't consider a permanent return to Hollyoaks.

Character development

During an interview with the BBC, Biddall spoke about Jessica, she described her as: "She's a new university student studying Marketing and Advertising. She's confident, outgoing, she wants to be the life and soul and she's had a long term boyfriend since she was 15. She's part of the perfect couple and she's hoping to stay with him, so we'll see how that one pans out." Jessica only sees status as an attractive quality in males, commenting on this Biddall adds: "My character tends to go for the ones who have a bit of a status. So I think she quite likes Lee, who's the student president, there's a bit of an interest there. But she might have a few surprises up her sleeve and she might not necessarily go for the guy you'd expect her to."

BBC America describe her as "The spoiled little rich girl always has Daddy on the line if she breaks a nail." They also say it isn't wise to "call her a snob" because she "just used to the finer things in life." They also state that "she's not beyond working for her keep, or fraternizing with the plebes. Quite the contrary, she quite fancies people who are different from her. For instance, she's had a romance with the quite-offbeat, usually penniless Gilly Roach. However, she does have a boyfriend from home named Mark." A writer from E4.com described her as having an extremely turbulent love life.

In 2007 Jessica was involved in a high-profile storyline in which she held a house party in which she has a boiler illegally fixed. It resulted in a carbon monoxide leak, which it was then revealed had helped save a viewers life who was going through exactly the same ordeal at the time of viewing. Cordinly stated: "The only respite I had in the middle of all my pain was Hollyoaks. I can’t believe I owe my life to it."

Storylines
When Jessica first arrived she couldn't be parted from her mobile phone and her link to ex-boyfriend Mark Jury (Ash Newman) but over time it seems she was drifting apart from her long-term boyfriend. When Mark turned up at the college Jessica had to retrieve a letter she sent dumping him for Gilly Roach (Anthony Quinlan). The two stayed together until the letter finally showed up revealing all. Mark and Gilly battled for her affections when she was in hospital for meningitis but she couldn't decide between them, so she wanted to date both of them. She later dumped Mark and Gilly saying that it was unfair on both of them. She and Olivia Johnson (Rochelle Gadd) protested about the fact that they were unfairly sacked at Il Gnosh, going to lengths such as a naked sit-in.

Her best friend, Olivia, died in The Dog in the Pond fire which left her heartbroken even though she didn't want to show it. New flatmate Kris Fisher (Gerard McCarthy), who had convinced Olivia to stand up for herself, taunted and insulted Jessica for not being a true friend to Olivia, going so far as to read to Jessica unflattering comments Olivia had made in her diary. In autumn 2006, she battled with Will Hackett (Oliver Farnworth) for the position of Editor of HCC's school newspaper. She got the position by using Russ Owen's (Stuart Manning) social anthropology research on the class differences between the Owens and the McQueens as her article, which caused Russ and Mercedes to break up for a while.

Jessica and Kris have had a somewhat turbulent relationship. Kris kissed a man in front of Jessica to make her jealous. In return, to make Kris jealous, she kissed Elliot Bevan (Garnon Davies), who had a crush on her. In early 2007 they were locked in the flat bathroom together, and finally admitted their attraction for one another. They were leaning in to kiss when flatmate Will opened the door. Kris stood up for Jessica against Will, Kris tried to throw her out of his room by saying "It looks as if we're done here" Jessica then continues to slam Kris' door with them both inside, saying "We are far from being done," before kissing him passionately. The two are seen continuing to kiss and falling back onto Kris' bed. They end up making love and in the morning they seemed to be happy with what had happened until they began to argue again. In an emotional twist in the storyline, Jessica feared for her health after Kris is tricked into believing that he is HIV positive after Will changed Kris's negative drug test results. Jessica had an HIV test which comes back negative. A few days later, Kris found out he was also HIV negative, but had a difficult time forgiving Jessica for her reaction.

In March 2007, Jessica discovered that her father had been declared bankrupt, thus putting an end to her glamorous lifestyle and plunging her into the harsh realities of being a strapped-for-cash student. She slept with Kris's brother Malachy Fisher (Glen Wallace), to make Kris jealous and get back at him for sleeping with Nathan. Jessica also helped Kris tell Malachy about his cross-dressing, bisexual nature. Malachy at first was disgusted but after speaking to Kris, ended up thinking that it was just a phase he was going through, although Kris knows differently. Jessica and Kris also slept together again, but Kris admitted to Jessica that he's only good for sex at the minute, Jessica seemed to be able to understand that and continued to support Kris. Kris then left town for several months. Jessica was told about Freeganism by Elliot when she was unable to afford food, however rather than taking wasted food from the Ashworth's store she took food off the storeroom shelves.

Due to Jessica's shortage of money, bailiffs visited her room and took some of her belongings. Jessica tried desperately to find money. After Tony refused to give her job back, OB offered her a job as MOBS, dressing as a Strawberry. A passerby offered her a job surveying property for resale at a high mark-up. Jessica soon began to feel guilty about conning people, however desperate for money, she scammed items for Jack and Frankie and then spend the money on new clothes. When Frankie found out she was angry and kicked Jessica out of The Dog in The Pond.

On 30 August her father returned and offered to repay her debts for her, claiming he had gotten his money back. However her father was still bankrupt and wanted to use Jessica to seduce a potential business partner. However he was arrested before he could close the deal. Jessica was upset at this and refused to visit her father in prison, until Zak Ramsey (Kent Riley) convinced her. Her father told her she was just like him, telling her he had stashed £1000 in the flat. He said she would more likely spend the money on herself then paying her debts. After some consideration, Jessica gave the money to Darren as repayment for conning him earlier.

When the hot water goes Jessica asks Danny Valentine (David Judge) to fix it cheaply for the housewarming party for John Paul McQueen (James Sutton) plus to welcome Kris back. Problem is that the boiler goes wrong and carbon monoxide fills the room. The smoke alarm goes off as a warning but Zak takes it out. The carbon monoxide makes everybody at the party feel ill. During this party Kris and Jessica danced together and shared a brief moment before it was ruined by Darren, Jessica said that she has missed him and they had been emailing each other over summer. Jessica was terrified she would be sued, but the school sent her a letter claiming all responsibility. When John Paul moved into the halls, Jessica gave him Elliot's room and lied to him that he had to pay her money she would then give to the school. This went on for some weeks until Elliot returned to find his belongings clumsily thrown into another room, some of them broken. He locked himself in her room for hours and hours as a protest, only to leave when he had to go to the bathroom. Meanwhile, John Paul moved back home.

When Zoe asked Jessica to place some money on a horse Jessica decided after much debating to treat herself with the money and lie to Zoe and say the horse lost, Zoe already found out the horse won and came to collect her money from an empty-handed Jessica. The tension between them ended in a fist fight when Jessica got drunk at the Freshers' ball, spilt a drink on Zoe's new dress and ripped it.

On Friday 23 November, Jessica slept with Zoe's boyfriend Darren Osborne (Ashley Taylor Dawson), after the pair had some luck at a casino, which led to them sleeping together on the pool table in The Dog in The Pond with money scattered around them. Two days after their steamy encounter on the pool table Jessica and Darren slept together again but both regretted it. Kris then found out and Jessica and Kris had a confrontation where Kris worked about Jessica and Darren's affair and Darren and Jessica going to the casino behind Zoe's back and the whole conversation was recorded on the radio. Zoe and the whole of Hollyoaks heard it and this led to Zoe moving out of the student flats. Zoe then got revenge by writing crude insults on Jessica's door and throwing her clothes all around the village. Jessica got her own back by editing Zoe's instructional video for Evissa salon to make it seem as if Carmel McQueen (Gemma Merna) was prostituting herself.

When Darren arranged a poker game with Warren Fox (Jamie Lomas) in the loft, Jessica came with him. The stakes got very high and Darren offered Warren his half of The Dog in The Pond - he promptly lost it to Warren. A couple of days later whilst walking through the village, Darren and Jessica followed a drunk Louise Summers (Roxanne McKee) home, so Darren can confront Warren. They walk in to find Louise passed out on the bed. Jessica and Darren see Evissa's takings on the bedside table and decide to steal the money. The following day, Jessica and Darren went to the casino with Evissa's takings and won £200,000. Jessica asked Darren what they would spend their money on, and Darren revealed that he was going use the money to buy The Dog in The Pond back from Warren. He also revealed that he planned to get back together with Zoe, much to the shock of Jessica. On New Year's Eve, Darren and Warren had a showdown and when Warren asked for the money on the stroke of midnight, Darren was shocked to discover that all of his money was gone. As Darren frantically searched for the money, Jessica departed Hollyoaks village for good - £200,000 richer.

References

External links
 Character profile  at E4.com
 Character profile at Hollyoaks.com
 Character profile on the BBC America website.

Hollyoaks characters
Television characters introduced in 2005
Female characters in television